Edgar Ellsworth Leip (November 29, 1910 – November 24, 1983) was a second baseman in Major League Baseball. He played for the Washington Senators and Pittsburgh Pirates.

Leip left the Pirates and entered the United States Army during World War II and did not return to the majors after the war.

References

External links

1910 births
1983 deaths
Major League Baseball second basemen
Washington Senators (1901–1960) players
Pittsburgh Pirates players
Minor league baseball managers
Baseball players from Trenton, New Jersey
Albany Senators players
Danville Leafs players
Greenville Spinners players
Leesburg Pirates players
Salisbury Indians players
Salisbury Pirates players
Springfield Nationals players
Syracuse Chiefs players
Toronto Maple Leafs (International League) players
United States Army personnel of World War II